Toma is a town located on the Gazelle Peninsula in East New Britain province, Papua New Guinea. It is located in Vunadidir-Toma Rural LLG.

History
The Siege of Toma occurred between Australian and German Empire troops between 14–17 September 1914 during World War I.

References

Populated places in East New Britain Province
World War I sites in Papua New Guinea